Grand Finale is a 1936 British comedy film directed by Ivar Campbell. The film was made at Shepperton Studios as a quota quickie for distribution by Paramount Pictures.

Cast
 Mary Glynne as Lina Parsons 
 Guy Newall as Hugo Trench 
 Glen Alyn as Pat Mainwaring  
 Douglas Rhodes as Peter Trench  
 Kim Peacock as Editor

References

Bibliography

External links

1936 films
British comedy films
1936 comedy films
Films directed by Ivar Campbell
Films shot at Shepperton Studios
Films produced by Anthony Havelock-Allan
Paramount Pictures films
British black-and-white films
British and Dominions Studios films
1930s English-language films
1930s British films